Honorary fellows of Somerville College, Oxford.

 Irangani Abeysekera
 Alyson Bailes
 Caroline Barron
 Janet Bately
 Sarah Broadie
 Dame Gillian Brown
 Alice Bruce
 Dame Antonia Byatt
 Dame Fiona Caldicott
 Dame Averil Cameron
 Margaret Casely-Hayford
 Elizabeth Millicent Chilver
 Dame Ellen Closs Stephens
 Dame Kay Davies
 Victoria Glendinning
 Jenny Glusker
 Joanna Haigh
 Dame Julia Higgins
 Carole Hillenbrand
 Judith Howard
 Catherine Hughes
 Lorna Hutson
 Dame Tamsyn Imison
 Margaret Jay, Baroness Jay of Paddington
 Louise Johnson
 Dame Emma Kirkby
 Akua Kuenyehia
 Anna Laura Lepschy
 Dame Rosalind Marsden
 May McKisack
 Dame Angela McLean
 Mary Midgley
 Michele Moody-Adams
 Lucy Neville-Rolfe, Baroness Neville-Rolfe
 Kate Norgate
 Ann Oakley
 Dame Kathleen Ollerenshaw
 Onora O'Neill, Baroness O'Neill of Bengarve
 Vijaya Lakshmi Pandit
 Daphne Park, Baroness Park of Monmouth
 Judith Parker
 Charles Powell, Baron Powell of Bayswater (Foundation Fellow)
 Alice Prochaska
 June Raine
 Sir Venkatraman Ramakrishnan
 Dame Esther Rantzen
 Joyce Reynolds
 Tessa Ross
 Emma Georgina Rothschild
 Dame Nancy Rothwell
 Wafic Saïd (Foundation Fellow)
 Caroline Series
 Hilary Spurling
 Dame Elan Closs Stephens
 Theresa Stewart
 Gopal Subramanium (Foundation Fellow)
 Dame Kiri Te Kanawa
 Margaret Thatcher, Baroness Thatcher
 Shriti Vadera, Baroness Vadera
 Dame Anne Warburton
 Jean Wilks
 Shirley Williams, Baroness Williams of Crosby
 Alison Wolf, Baroness Wolf of Dulwich

References

 
Somerville